Maria Elena Bello (born April 18, 1967) is an American actress and writer. Her film roles include Permanent Midnight (1998), Payback (1999), Coyote Ugly (2000), The Cooler (2003), A History of Violence (2005), The Mummy: Tomb of the Dragon Emperor (2008), Grown Ups (2010), Prisoners (2013), and Lights Out (2016). On television, Bello appeared as Dr. Anna Del Amico on the medical drama ER (1997–1998), with other starring roles including as Lucy Robbins on the series Touch in 2013, as Michelle McBride on the first season of the series Goliath in 2016, and from 2017 to 2021 as Special Agent Jacqueline "Jack" Sloane on the series NCIS.

The Guardian named her one of the best actors never to have received an Academy Award nomination.

Early life
Bello was born April 18, 1967 in Norristown, Pennsylvania, to Kathy, a school nurse and teacher, and Joe Bello, a contractor. Her father is Italian American, with roots in Montella, Italy, and her mother is Polish American. She grew up in a working-class, Catholic family and graduated from Archbishop John Carroll High School in Radnor, Pennsylvania. She majored in political science at Villanova University. Following graduation, Bello honed her acting skills in a number of New York theater productions.

Career

Bello's early TV appearances include episodes of The Commish (1991), Due South (1994), Nowhere Man (1995), Misery Loves Company (1995), and ER (1997–98). Her breakthrough came when she was cast as Mrs. Smith in the TV series spy show Mr. & Mrs. Smith, though the show was cancelled after eight weeks. She then appeared in the final three episodes of the third season of ER as pediatrician Dr. Anna Del Amico and was a regular cast member during the medical drama's fourth season.

Bello moved on to films, landing a role in Coyote Ugly (2000). She was nominated for the Golden Globe award twice: for Best Supporting Actress in The Cooler (2003) and for Best Actress in A History of Violence (2005). She starred in The Jane Austen Book Club (2007) as Jocelyn and as Dr. Alex Sabian in the 2005 film, Assault on Precinct 13, a remake of the original 1976 movie made by John Carpenter. In 2008, she starred in The Mummy: Tomb of the Dragon Emperor as Evelyn O'Connell, replacing Rachel Weisz. In December 2008, Bello began developing a drama for HBO. Besides starring in the new series, Bello planned to also serve as an executive producer. She starred in the 2009 drama film The Yellow Handkerchief, which was released in theatres on February 26, 2010, by Samuel Goldwyn Films.

In 2010, Bello guest starred in two episodes of Law & Order: Special Victims Unit. The following year, she starred in the TV series Prime Suspect, which was cancelled after 13 episodes. In 2011, she became a founding board member of the CQ Matrix Company, a company created by her then-partner, Clare Munn, to help clients achieve "transformative living and the power of intelligent exchange" by enhancing their communication quotient. In 2014, she starred alongside Frank Grillo in the James Wan-produced thriller Demonic.

Bello began producing short films in 2010. In 2022, she was a producer on the film The Woman King.

Personal life

Bello has a son Jackson with her former boyfriend Dan McDermott. In November 2013, she wrote about having a same-sex relationship with her then-partner, Clare Munn. She published a book, Whatever...Love Is Love: Questioning the Labels We Give Ourselves (Dey Street Books, April 28, 2015).
 
In February 2020, while attending the 92nd Academy Awards in their first public appearance as a couple, Bello announced she and chef Dominique Crenn had become engaged on December 29, 2019, while holidaying in Paris, France.

Philanthropy
In the aftermath of the 2010 Haiti earthquake, Bello founded WE ADVANCE with Aleda Frishman, Barbara Guillaume, and Alison Thompson. It is an organization that encourages Haitian women to collaborate in making healthcare a priority, and putting an end to domestic violence within their communities. In March 2011, she also led fundraising efforts in Philadelphia and donated to the devastating earthquake, tsunami, and the subsequent nuclear disaster in Japan.

, the organization is based in a health clinic and a community outreach center in Cité Soleil. Bello is also a board member of Darfur Women Action Group, an NGO that undertakes activism on behalf of genocide victims of the Darfur conflict.

Filmography

Awards and nominations

References

External links

 Maria Bello on Twitter
 Maria Bello on Instagram

Living people
20th-century American actresses
21st-century American actresses
Actresses from Pennsylvania
American film actresses
American people of Italian descent
American people of Polish descent
American television actresses
LGBT actresses
LGBT people from Pennsylvania
American LGBT actors
People from Norristown, Pennsylvania
Villanova University alumni
Archbishop John Carroll High School alumni
1967 births